The Omsk Academy of the Ministry of Internal Affairs is a university in Omsk, Russia. It is a higher institution that falls under the jurisdiction of the Ministry of Internal Affairs of the Russian Federation. It is currently led by Major General Sergey Buryakov.

Structure
It consists of four departments, as well as 9 departments with legal, economic and humanitarian descriptions.

Departments
Department of Administrative Law and Administrative Activities
Department of Forensics
Department of Investigative Activities
Department of Criminal Procedure
Department of Physical Training
Department of Fire Training
Department of Internal Affairs
Department of Civil Law
Department of Foreign Languages
Department of Constitutional and International Law
Department of Criminology, Psychology and Pedagogy
Department of Theory and History of Law and State
Department of Criminal Law
Department of Information Technologies
Department of Philosophy and Political Science
Department of Economic Theory and Financial Law
Department of Psychology and Pedagogy

Governing bodies
Academic Council
Conference

Faculties
 Police Training Faculty
 Department of Investigation
 Faculty of Correspondence and Advanced Training
 Faculty of Vocational Training

Graduates
Pyotr Latyshev, the 1st Russian Presidential Envoy to the Urals Federal District
Vladimir Rushailo, former Minister of Internal Affairs
Ivan Kichmarenko, former Head of the Biysk City Administration
Alexander Reimer, former head of the Federal Penitentiary Service

References

Omsk
Universities in Omsk Oblast
Police academies in Russia